The Davao–Cotabato Road is a , two-to-six lane major national primary road, connecting the provinces of Davao del Sur, Maguindanao del Sur, Cotabato, and Maguindanao del Norte. It runs from Davao City to Sultan Kudarat, Maguindanao del Norte.

This road is designated as part of National Route 1 (N1) and National Route 75 (N75) of the Philippine highway network and partially Asian Highway 26 (AH26) of the Asian highway network.

Route description

Davao City to Digos 
Starting at the Bonifacio Rotunda in the city proper of Davao, Davao–Cotabato Road runs northwest as A. Pichon Street, a one-way street carrying southeast-bound traffic. It then turns southwest to Elpidio Quirino Avenue and becomes McArthur Highway at General Generoso Bridge I over Davao River, all through Davao City proper. It then enters Santa Cruz, Davao del Sur as it traverses its eastern coast. It enters Digos and there it meets Digos–Makar Road, locally known as Rizal Avenue, where N1/AH26 would continue.

This section is part of Maharlika Highway or Asian Highway 26 (AH26), which covers most of National Route 1 (N1).

Digos to Makilala 

N75 commences at the intersection with N1/AH26. There is a gateway sign when entering Makilala.

Makilala to Matalam 
At Makilala, it connects towards Makilala–Allah Valley Road (N76) which links Makilala to Sultan Kudarat Province. It traverses Kidapawan and connects to Paco–Roxas–Arakan Valley–Junction Davao–Bukidnon Road (N942). There is a roundabout that connects Davao–Cotabato Road to a national tertiary highway that leads to M'lang and a shortcut for Makilala–Allah Valley Road (N76).

Matalam to Kabacan 
Davao–Cotabato Road traverses towards Kabacan and has a crossing that links up with Sayre Highway (N943). It connects North Cotabato to Bukidnon.

Kabacan to Midsayap 
At Kabacan, the Davao–Cotabato Road traverses towards Maguindanao del Sur into Datu Montawal and Pagalungan. At Midsayap, it links to N940 that traverses towards Marbel.

Midsayap to Sultan Kudarat, Maguindanao del Norte 
N75 traverses towards into Libungan and links up with Banisilan–Guiling–Alamada–Libungan Road (N944). It finally traverses towards Pigcawayan and Sultan Kudarat into its western section.

History 
The highway existed back to the American colonial era as part of Highway 1 in Mindanao that linked Surigao and Davao via Cagayan. The route markers were added in 2014 (for N1/AH26) and 2017 (for N75), although the look of the N75 route marker is different in Davao del Sur due to the stretched 5.

Intersections

References 

Roads in Davao del Sur
Roads in Cotabato
Roads in Maguindanao del Norte
Roads in Maguindanao del Sur